Tubuaia is a genus of air-breathing land snails, terrestrial pulmonate gastropod mollusks in the family Achatinellidae.

Species
There are 18 species plus several subspecies. The 18 species are as follows:
 Tubuaia affinis
 Tubuaia amoebodonta
 Tubuaia bakerorum
 Tubuaia coprophora
 Tubuaia cremnobates
 Tubuaia cylindrata
 Tubuaia fosbergi
 Tubuaia garrettiana
 Tubuaia gouldi
 Tubuaia hendersoni
 Tubuaia hygrobia
 Tubuaia inconstans
 Tubuaia myojinae
 Tubuaia perplexa
 Tubuaia raoulensis
 Tubuaia saintjohni
 Tubuaia saproderma
 Tubuaia voyana

References

 
Gastropod genera
Molluscs of Oceania
Helicarionidae
Taxonomy articles created by Polbot